Giorgio Sirilli (born 1949 in Albano Laziale) is an Italian scholar in the field of science and technology policy.

Biography
After graduation in Economics from the University of Rome "La Sapienza", he did research at the Science Policy Research
Unit (SPRU) at Sussex University in England with Christopher Freeman and Keith Pavitt, and at the
Organisation for Economic Co-operation and Development (OECD).

Professor of Economics and Management of innovation in various Italian universities (LUISS, Tor Vergata University, Unitelma).

As chairman of the OECD Group of National Experts on Science and Technology Indicators (NESTI) he contributed to the development and revision of various statistical manuals (Frascati Manual on R&D, Oslo Manual on Technological and Organizational Innovation, Canberra Manual on Human Resources for Science and Technology, Patents Manual).

Author of over 220 scientific publications. He was the councillor for budget in Albano Laziale, his home city,  and is a co-author of the Dictionary of Albanense Dialect

recent publications
Giuffrida S., Silvani A., Sirilli G., Research evaluation of the Italian CNR institutes: a missed opportunity?, ISSiRFA, Roma, January 2011
Sirilli G., Science and Technology Indicators: Challenges of the Next Decade, in Albornoz M., (ed) Agenda 2011. Temas de Indicadores de Ciencia Y Tecnologia, RICYT, Buenos Aires, 2011
Sirilli G. et al., The MEADOW Guidelines, MEADOW Consortium, Paris, 2010
Sirilli G. (ed.), La produzione e la diffusione della conoscenza. Ricerca, innovazione e risorse umane, Fondazione CRUI, Roma, luglio 2010. 
Perani G., Sirilli G., La dimensione regionale della ricerca e dell'innovazione, Quinto Rapporto annuale sullo stato del regionalismo-2008, Milano, Giuffrè, 2008
Sirilli G., Tuzi F., An evaluation of government-financed R&D projects in Italy, Research Evaluation, volume 18, n. 2, June 2009, pp. 163–172
Sirilli G., Innovazione tecnologica, Enciclopedia della Scienza e della Tecnica, Volume V, pp. 311–322, Roma, Istituto della Enciclopedia Italiana, 2008
AA. VV., La valutazione della ricerca. Libro bianco, Consiglio Italiano per le Scienze Sociali, Marsilio, Venezia, 2006
Sirilli G., Ricerca e sviluppo, Il Mulino, Bologna, 2005
Silvani A., Sirilli G., Tuzi F., R&D evaluation in Italy: More needs to be done, Research Evaluation, vol. 14, n. 3, December 2005, pp. 207–215

References

1949 births
Living people
People from Albano Laziale
Academic staff of the Libera Università Internazionale degli Studi Sociali Guido Carli
Innovation economists
Alumni of the Science Policy Research Unit